Checkpoint was a cannabis coffee shop in Terneuzen, the largest such in the Netherlands until it was closed in 2008 by the authorities because of reputedly having a too large supply of cannabis.

Establishment
In 1996, the municipality of Terneuzen was the only town in Zeeland as tolerant in an end to the illegal sale. Two coffee shops got a license, "Miami" and the already operating illegally Checkpoint. Checkpoint made use of forced removals to significantly expand a mega coffeeshop where on average 2,900 customers per day (on peak days to 5000) take a number and then had to pull one of the five tills a bag hash or weed to be met. The coffee shop had its own parking, café and restaurant, almost one hundred employees and an annual turnover of 26 million euros. Half of the visitors came from France and 40 percent from Belgium.

Raid
On 1 June 2007 the police raided the coffeeshop, where 4.5 kilograms of soft drugs were found. In a neighboring warehouse police found another 92 pounds. This is much more than in the AHOJ-G criteria maximum of 500 grams of stock. On 20 May 2008, the police again raided the shop and thirteen addresses. This time 160 pounds soft drugs were seized and the coffee shop was closed.

Trial
On 3 November 2009 the trial of fifteen employees of the coffee shop, where prison sentences to eighteen years and a confiscation order of 27 million was demanded. It was the first time that a coffee shop was prosecuted as a criminal organization. On 25 March 2010, the court ruling. The defendants were found guilty but received light sentences. Prime suspect and owner Maddie W. received a prison sentence of 16 weeks and other employees received prison sentences for which the judgment is not transcended. The confiscation order amounted to 10 million euros. The court did weigh the municipality of Terneuzen, the Public Prosecutor and the treasury not despite these interventions were aware of the scope of the case, which the owner always has been open. The court accused the municipality of the ban on advertising for coffee shops to have violated verwijsbordjes by placing the coffee shops. Following the ruling mayor asked Jan Lonink national politics to establish clearer rules.

Sources
 Drug nuisance too big to pass through to overlook, Times, May 29, 2008
 The coffeeshop of Frankenstein, The Standard, 31 October 2009
 Storage Checkpoint already known in 2002, PZC, November 4, 2009
 Case Checkpoint arrested for photos, BN De Stem, 5 November 2009
 Pronunciation case Checkpoint, PZC TV, March 25, 2010
 Mayor: lessons from case Checkpoint, Wedding, March 25, 2010

Cannabis coffeeshops
Buildings and structures in Zeeland
2008 disestablishments in the Netherlands
Terneuzen
1996 in cannabis